Schoenionta breuningi is a species of beetle in the family Cerambycidae. It was described by Siess in 1974.

References

Saperdini
Beetles described in 1974